"Games" is a song by American R&B singer Chuckii Booker, from his second studio album Niice 'n Wiild. The single spent one week at number-one on the U.S. Billboard Hot R&B/Hip-Hop Songs chart and peaked at number sixty-eight on the U.S. Billboard Hot 100.

Until Trey Songz's song "I Invented Sex" from 2009 to 2010, "Games" was the most recent song to peak at number-one on the U.S. Billboard R&B chart while failing to reach the Top 40 on the Billboard Hot 100.

In 1995, The Luniz interpolated the song on the track "Playa Hater" from the album Operation Stackola. It was also interpolated the 1993 Tevin Campbell hit "Can We Talk". 

In 1996, Mark Morrison sampled Booker's "Games" in his 1996 hit song, "Return of the Mack".

According to Chuckii Booker’s Instagram on September 8, 2018 the female on the song saying “Chuckii! Chuckii!” is Janet Jackson.

Most recently, in 2022, R&B group Sentury interpolated the song on the track "Say That."

Charts

Weekly charts

Year-end charts

See also
List of number-one R&B singles of 1992 (U.S.)

References
 
 

1992 singles
1992 songs
Atlantic Records singles
Songs written by Chuckii Booker
Songs written by Gerald Levert
Chuckii Booker songs